Mberengwa Rural District Council is the rural district local authority over Mberengwa District.
It is one of the 8 rural district councils in the Midlands Province, established in terms of the Zimbabwe Rural District Councils Act; Chapter 29.13.

Background

Mberengwa Rural District Council is the sole local government organ in Mberengwa District unlike Vungu Rural District Council, Zibagwe Rural District Council, Tongogara Rural District Council, Runde Rural District Council and Gokwe South Rural District Council that work together with urban councils in their respective district. Mberengwa District is all rural.

Ward Distribution

Mberengwa Rural District Council covers 37 wards in four constituencies.

 Mberengwa-East has 7 wards
3, 4, 5, 6, 7, 8 and 20.

 Mberengwa-West has 8 wards;
13, 14, 29, 30, 31, 32, 33 and 34.

 Mberengwa-North has 12 wards;
1, 2, 9, 10, 11, 12, 15, 16, 17, 35, 36 and 37.

 Mberengwa-South has 10 wards; 
18, 19, 21, 22, 23, 24, 25, 26, 27 and 28.

2013 - 2018 Councillors

Source: Zimbabwe Electoral Commission

2008 - 2013 Coincillors

All councillors in this term were from ZANU-PF.

Source: Kubatana Aechive

See also

 Mberengwa District 
 Runde Rural District Council
 Tongogara Rural District Council
 Takawira Rural District Council 
 Gokwe North Rural District Council

References 

Districts of Midlands Province